is a Buddhist temple that was once one of the powerful Seven Great Temples in the city of Nara, Japan. The temple is the national headquarters of the Hossō school.

History
Kōfuku-ji has its origin as a temple that was established in 669 by Kagami-no-Ōkimi, the wife of Fujiwara no Kamatari, wishing for her husband’s recovery from illness. Its original site was in Yamashina, Yamashiro Province (present-day Kyoto). In 672, the temple was moved to Fujiwara-kyō, the first planned Japanese capital to copy the orthogonal grid pattern of Chang'an. In 710, the temple was dismantled for the second time and moved to its present location, on the east side of the newly constructed capital, Heijō-kyō, today's Nara.

Kōfuku-ji was the Fujiwara's tutelary temple, and enjoyed prosperity for as long as the family did. The temple was not only an important center for the Buddhist religion, but also retained influence over the imperial government, and even by "aggressive means" in some cases. When many of the Nanto Shichi Daiji, such as Tōdai-ji, declined after the move of capital to Heian-kyō (Kyoto), Kōfuku-ji kept its significance because of its connection to the Fujiwara.

The temple was damaged and destroyed by civil wars and fires many times,  and was rebuilt as many times as well, although finally some of the important buildings, such as one of the three golden halls, the Nandaimon, Chūmon and the corridor were never reconstructed and are missing today. The rebuilding of the Central Golden Hall was completed in 2018.

It was relocated due its deteriorated state and is now in the gardens of the Tokyo National Museum.

Architectures and treasures

The following are some of the temple's buildings and treasures of note.

Architecture
 , 1425, one of the former three golden halls (National Treasure)
, 2018, reconstructed, the former temporary Central Golden Hall building (仮金堂) now serves as the temporary Lecture Hall (仮講堂)
 , 1426 (National Treasure)
 , 1185(National Treasure)
 , 1210 (National Treasure)
 , 1741, Site No.9 of Saigoku 33 Pilgrimage (Important Cultural Property)
 , 1394–1427 (Important Cultural Property)

Treasures
 (Statue) The Devas of the Eight Classes, including dry-lacquer Ashura (National Treasure)
 (Statue) The Ten Great Disciples (National Treasure)
 (Statue) Thousand-armed Kannon (National Treasure)
 (Statue)  attributed to Kōkei, is housed in Nan'endō (National Treasure)

Plan
Showing the original layout of the temple, with the later three-storied pagoda, Nan'en-dō, and Ōyūya superimposed. Of the buildings marked, only these three together with the five-storied pagoda, Tōkon-dō and Hoku'en-dō remain.

Gallery

See also 
 For an explanation of terms concerning Japanese Buddhism, Japanese Buddhist art, and Japanese Buddhist temple architecture, see the Glossary of Japanese Buddhism.
List of National Treasures of Japan (archaeological materials)
List of National Treasures of Japan (crafts-others)
List of National Treasures of Japan (sculptures)
List of National Treasures of Japan (temples)
Siege of Nara

Notes

References

External links 

 Kōfuku-ji web site
 Kōfuku-ji web site
 Kohfukuji Temple, from The Official Nara Travel Guide
 Nara Prefecture page on Kōfuku-ji
 UNESCO
 Exhibition of artifacts from Kofukuji reviewed in The Japan Times

Buddhist temples in Nara, Nara
National Treasures of Japan
World Heritage Sites in Japan
Important Cultural Properties of Japan
Pagodas in Japan
Asuka period
Historic Sites of Japan
Maitreya
Jingū-ji
Religious buildings and structures completed in 669
7th-century Buddhist temples